Epidermal nevus syndrome (also known as "Feuerstein and Mims syndrome", and "Solomon's syndrome") is a rare disease that was first described in 1968 and consists of extensive epidermal nevi with abnormalities of the central nervous system (CNS), skeleton, skin, cardiovascular system, genitourinary system and eyes. However, since the syndrome's first description, a broader concept for the "epidermal nevus" syndrome has been proposed, with at least six types being described:
 Schimmelpenning syndrome
 Nevus comedonicus syndrome
 Pigmented hairy epidermal nevus syndrome
 Proteus syndrome
 CHILD syndrome
 Phakomatosis pigmentokeratotica

See also
 Epidermis
 List of cutaneous conditions

References

External links 

Epidermal nevi, neoplasms, and cysts
Rare syndromes